Pallis is a Greek surname and may refer to:

 Alexandros Pallis (1851–1935), Greek educational and language reformer who translated the New Testament into Modern Greek
 Chris Pallis (1923–2005), Anglo-Greek neurologist and socialist intellectual
 Jani Macari Pallis, American academic, engineer, and executive
 Konstantinos Pallis (1871–1941), Greek Army staff officer, who served as chief of staff of the Army of Asia Minor
 Marco Pallis (1895–1989), Greek-British author and mountaineer
 Marietta Pallis (1882–1963), Greek-Briton ecologist and botanical artist

See also
Palli (disambiguation)

Greek-language surnames
Surnames